Angul  (also known as Anugul) is a town and a municipality and the headquarters of Angul district in the state of Odisha, India.
The total geographical area of the district is 6232 km2. From the point of view of area, it stands 11th among the 30 Districts of Odisha.

Geography
The total geographical area of the district is 6232 km2. From the point of view of area, it stands 11th among the 30 Districts of Odisha.

Demographics
As of the 2011 Census of India, Angul had a population of 44,390. Males constitute 55% of the population and females 45%. Anugul has an average literacy rate of 77.53%, higher than the national average of 74.04%; with 58% of the males and 42% of females literate. About 11% of the population is under 6 years of age. There are almost 3-4 Government High Schools are present for Odia Medium Education. Although, A Sishu Vidya Mandir and two Kendriya Vidyalaya Angul Schools are there for children.

Politics
In the 2019 Indian general election, Mahesh Sahoo (BJD) won from Dhenkanal (Lok Sabha constituency).
In Loksabha general election 2014, Nagendra Pradhan (BJD) and Tathagat Satpathy (BJD) were elected from Sambalpur and Dhenkanal loksabha constituency respectively.
Angul is part of Dhenkanal (Lok Sabha constituency).

The current MLA from Angul (Odisha Vidhan Sabha constituency) is Rajanikant Singh of BJD who is elected in 2019 Odisha Legislative Assembly election and subsequently elected unopposed as the deputy speaker of the assembly. He won the seat in State elections of 2004, 2009, and 2014. His father Adwait Prasad Singh had won this seat in 2000 as a BJD candidate, in 1990 as JD candidate and in 1977 as JNP candidate. Earlier MLAs from this seat were Ramesh Jena of INC in 1995, Prafulla Mishra of INC in 1985, and Santosh Kumar Pradhan of INC(I) in 1980.

Girija Nandini Sahoo of BJD is the current President Zilla Parishad, Angul. She will hold the post from 2012 to 2017.

Climate

References

External links
 Official Website

Cities and towns in Angul district